Silvia Farina Elia and Iroda Tulyaganova were the defending champions, but both players decided to focus on the singles tournament. Farina Elia ended up winning that title.

Jennifer Hopkins and Jelena Kostanić won the title by defeating Caroline Dhenin and Maja Matevžič 0–6, 6–4, 6–4 in the final.

Seeds

Draw

Draw

References

External links
 Official results archive (ITF)
 Official results archive (WTA)

Internationaux de Strasbourgandnbsp;- Doubles
2002 Doubles
Internationaux de Strasbourg